Soyuz 7K-OKS (also known as Soyuz 7KT-OK) is a version of the Soyuz spacecraft and was the first spacecraft designed for space station flights. Its only crewed flights were conducted in 1971, with Soyuz 10 and Soyuz 11.

Design 
The two craft of the Soyuz 7K-OKS generation were modified from the original Soyuz 7K-OK. The new "probe and drogue" docking mechanism, which was first used by these two missions, featured an internal docking hatch that allowed for the first time internal transfer between Soviet spacecraft. This "probe and drogue" docking mechanism introduced with Soyuz 7K-OKS is still in use today at the International Space Station (ISS). The external toroidal fuel tank, a holdover from the original lunar mission models of the Soyuz, was dropped from the 7K-OKS since it was unneeded for Earth orbital flights.

Flights 
The Soyuz 7K-OKS flew only twice, Soyuz 10 and Soyuz 11.

On its maiden flight, the Soyuz 7K-OKS successfully launched into Earth orbit, but failed to dock completely with the Salyut 1 space station. Upon reentry, the spacecraft encountered problems with toxic fumes.

This generation of Soyuz spacecraft is notable for the first successful delivery of crew to the first space station Salyut 1 by Soyuz 11 – this success was however overshadowed by the death of the crew, who were killed when the capsule depressurised during the re-entry phase.

Missions 
 Soyuz 10
 Soyuz 11

References

External links 
 Russia New Russian spaceship will be able to fly to Moon - space corp
 RSC Energia: Concept Of Russian Manned Space Navigation Development
 Mir Hardware Heritage
 David S.F. Portree, Mir Hardware Heritage, NASA RP-1357, 1995
 Mir Hardware Heritage (wikisource)
 Information on Soyuz spacecraft 
 OMWorld's ASTP Docking Trainer Page
 NASA - Russian Soyuz TMA Spacecraft Details
 Space Adventures circum-lunar mission - details

Crewed spacecraft
Soyuz program
Vehicles introduced in 1971